The Palace of Longoria (Spanish: Palacio de Longoria) is an Art Nouveau palace that the politician and financier Francisco Javier González Longoria ordered to be built in the district of Chueca, at the corner of Fernando VI and Pelayo streets, in the city of Madrid, Spain.  Together with the House of Gallardo (Spanish: Casa Gallardo) in the Plaza de España, it is Madrid's most notable example of modernist architecture.  

Longoria contracted the Catalán architect José Grases Riera to design and build it in 1902. It was declared Bien de Interés Cultural in 1996 and is currently the headquarters of the Sociedad General de Autores y Editores (SGAE).

References

External links 

Palaces in Madrid
Bien de Interés Cultural landmarks in Madrid
Art Nouveau architecture in Spain
Art Nouveau houses
Buildings and structures completed in 1904
Buildings and structures in Justicia neighborhood, Madrid